Edward Ronald "Eddie" Hart (16 June 1922 – 16 August 1995) was an Australian rules footballer who played with Fitzroy in the VFL during the 1940s.

From 1947 until 1951 Hart topped Fitzroy's goalkicking, with over 50 goals in each season — his highest season tally was 65 goals in 1951 — and, in 1948, 1949, and 1951, he finished as the league's third highest goal scorer.

Family
The son of Frederick Arthur Hart, and Elizabeth Hart, née King, Edward Ronald Hart was born on 16 June 1922.

Two of his brothers, Arthur Hart, and Don Hart also played for Fitzroy.

Football
He retired before the 1952 season began, as a consequence of a knock to his head that he received during the 1951 season.

Footnotes

References
 
 World War Two Nominal Roll: Sapper Edward Ronald Hart (VX139389).

External links

1922 births
1995 deaths
Australian rules footballers from Victoria (Australia)
Fitzroy Football Club players